An ocular micrometer or eyepiece micrometer is a glass disk, engraved with a ruled scale, that fits in an eyepiece of a microscope, which is used to measure the size of microscopic objects through magnification under a microscope. When the eyepiece micrometer is calibrated using a stage micrometer, the length of the divisions on the scale depends on the degree of magnification.

References

External links
Laboratory Investigation: The Micrometer Eyepiece
Microscopy